The Swee' Pea was a series of three midget aircraft racers designed by Art Chester.

Design and development
The Swee' Pea was a racing aircraft to compete in the new midget racing class championed by race pilot Art Chester. The aircraft was the third design from Chester with a Popeye comic name.

The midget racer was required to have an engine less than 190 cubic inches in displacement at the time. The Swee' Pea shared a similar short, mid-wing taildragger configuration with other midget racers. The aircraft was unique in that it used a V tail configuration and a single cooling air intake through a large hole in the center of the spinner. The Fuselage is welded tube steel with plywood covered wings.

Operational history
The Swee' Pea was introduced at the 1947 National Air Races, but the V-Tail performed poorly at takeoff speed, and was replaced by a conventional tail for the 1948 Miami races. The top speed was reduced with a conventional tail, so the V-Tail was re-installed.

Variants
Swee' Pea
Later Renamed "Sky Baby" - one built
Swee' Pea II
Modified with a Y-tail (similar to the Sonex Waiex). Art Chester died in a crash in this plane at the San Diego Air Races on 24 April 1949. - one built
Wimpy
The Swee' Pea modified with the main gear farther back. This aircraft crashed on 25 July 1948 at Rosemead airfield, due to blanking of the v-tail during a slow manoeuvre. - one built

Specifications (Chester Swee' Pea)

See also

References

Racing aircraft
Mid-wing aircraft
Aircraft first flown in 1947
Single-engined tractor aircraft